Dürr may refer to:

 Alfred Dürr (1918–2011), German musicologist
 Christian Dürr (born 1977), German politician
 Emil Dürr (1920–1944), Unterscharführer
 Françoise Dürr (born 1942), French tennis player
 Hans-Peter Dürr (1929–2014), German physicist
 Heinz Dürr (born 1933), German entrepreneur
 Johannes Dürr (born 1987), Austrian cross-country skier
 Lena Dürr (born 1991), German alpine skier, daughter of Peter Dürr
 Ludwig Dürr (1878–1956), German airship designer
 Peter Dürr (born 1960), German alpine skier
 Renate Dürr, (born 1961), German academic
 Richard Dürr (1938–2014), Swiss footballer
 Thomas D (Thomas Dürr, born 1968), rapper in the German hip hop group Die Fantastischen Vier
 Thomas Dürr (bobsledder) (born 1978), bobsledder from Liechtenstein
 Walther Dürr (1932–2018), German musicologist
 Wilhelm Dürr the Younger (1857–1900), German painter and draughtsman

See also
 
 Duerr (disambiguation)
 Durr (disambiguation)

Surnames from nicknames